The Finn Men's Competition was a sailing event on the program at the 1996 Summer Olympics that was held from 22 July to 2 August 1996 in Savannah, Georgia, United States. Points were awarded for placement in each race. Eleven races were scheduled. Ten races were sailed. Each sailor had two discards.

Results

Daily standings

Conditions at the Finn course area's

Notes

References 
 
 
 

 
 

Finn
Finn competitions
Men's events at the 1996 Summer Olympics